The 2010 BSI Challenger Lugano was a professional tennis tournament played on outdoor red clay courts. It was part of the Tretorn SERIE+ of the 2010 ATP Challenger Tour. It took place in Lugano, Switzerland between 7 and 13 June 2010.

ATP entrants

Seeds

 Rankings are as of May 24, 2010.

Other entrants
The following players received wildcards into the singles main draw:
  Marco Crugnola
  Sandro Ehrat
  Alexander Sadecky
  Stanislas Wawrinka

The following players received entry a special Exempt into the singles main draw:
  Robin Haase

The following players received entry from the qualifying draw:
  Farrukh Dustov
  Olivier Patience
  Nicolas Renavand
  Bruno Rodríguez

Champions

Singles

 Stanislas Wawrinka def.  Potito Starace 6–7(2), 6–2, 6–1

Doubles

 Frederico Gil /  Christophe Rochus def.  Santiago González /  Travis Rettenmaier, 7–5, 7–6(3)

References

Official website
ITF search 

BSI Challenger Lugano
Tretorn SERIE+ tournaments
Clay court tennis tournaments
Tennis tournaments in Switzerland
2010 in Swiss tennis